The Fjölnir women's basketball team, commonly known as Fjölnir, represents Ungmennafélagið Fjölnir multi-sport club and is based in Grafarvogur, Reykjavík. As of the 2018–2019 season it plays in the Icelandic 1. deild kvenna.

History
Fjölnir played in the top-tier Úrvalsdeild kvenna from 2007 to 2009 and 2010 to 2013. It won its first Úrvalsdeild victory on 3 November 2007. On 2 March 2019, the team won the 1. deild kvenna for the third time in its history. It face Grindavík in the promotion playoffs for a seat in the Úrvalsdeild where it lost 0-3. After the 2019-2020 season was discontinued due to the COVID-19 pandemic in Iceland, Fjölnir was appointed the winner of 1. deild kvenna, due to being in top place at the time, and promoted to the Úrvalsdeild kvenna. Fjölnir finished the 2020–21 season with a 14-7 record and secured a spot in the Úrvalsdeild playoffs for the first time in its history.

Titles and awards

Titles
1. deild kvenna
 Winners (2): 2007, 2010, 2019, 2020

Individual awards

Úrvalsdeild Domestic Player of the Year
Dagný Lísa Davíðsdóttir - 2022
Úrvalsdeild Foreign Player of the Year
Aliyah Mazyck - 2022
Úrvalsdeild Domestic All-First Team
Dagný Lísa Davíðsdóttir - 2022
Úrvalsdeild Women's Young Player of the Year
Bergþóra Tómasdóttir - 2011
1. deild Domestic MVP
Gréta María Grétarsdóttir - 2010
1. deild kvenna Domestic All-First team
Berglind Karen Ingvarsdóttir - 2018
Eva María Emilsdóttir - 2010
Gréta María Grétarsdóttir - 2010
Hulda Ósk Bergsteinsdóttir - 2019
1. deild kvenna Coach of the Year
Eggert Maríuson - 2010

Notable players

Coaches
 2007 Nemanja Sovic
 2007–2008 Gréta María Grétarsdóttir
 2008–2009 Patrick Oliver
 2009–2010 Eggert Maríuson
 2010 Bjarni Magnússon and Örvar Þór Kristjánsson
 2011–2012 Bragi Magnússon
 2012–2013 Ágúst Jensson
 2013–2015 Pétur Már Sigurðsson
 2015–2018 Sævaldur Bjarnason
 2018–2022 Halldór Karl Þórisson
 2022–present Kristjana Eir Jónsdóttir
Source 1 Source 2

References

External links
Team profile at kki.is

Fjölnir (basketball)